The Australian War Memorial is Australia's national memorial to the members of its armed forces and supporting organisations who have died or participated in wars involving the Commonwealth of Australia and some conflicts involving personnel from the Australian colonies prior to Federation. Opened in 1941, the memorial includes an extensive national military museum.

The Australian War Memorial forms the north terminus of the city's ceremonial land axis, which stretches from Parliament House on Capital Hill along a line passing through the summit of the cone-shaped Mount Ainslie to the northeast. No continuous roadway links the two points, but there is a clear line of sight from the front balcony of Parliament House to the war memorial, and from the front steps of the war memorial back to Parliament House.

The Australian War Memorial consists of three parts: the Commemorative Area (shrine) including the Hall of Memory with the Tomb of the Unknown Australian Soldier, the memorial's galleries (museum) and Research Centre (records). The memorial also has an outdoor Sculpture Garden. The memorial is  open daily from 10am until 5pm, excluding Christmas Day.

Other monuments and memorials located on the adjacent Anzac Parade are maintained separately by the National Capital Authority (NCA) and do not form part of the Australian War Memorial.

History
Charles Bean, Australia's official World War I historian, first conceived a museum memorial to Australian soldiers while observing the 1916 battles in France. The Australian War Records Section was established in May 1917 to ensure preservation of records relating to the war being fought at the time. Records and relics were exhibited first in Melbourne and later Canberra.

An architecture competition in 1927 did not produce a winning entry. Two of the entrants, Sydney architects Emil Sodersten and John Crust, were however encouraged to re-present a joint design. A limited budget and the effects of the Depression confined the scope of the project.

The memorial was initially planned as a museum memorial dedicated solely to the remembrance of Australian involvement in World War I. However, in 1939, as it became clear that a second war of similar proportions would break out, the memorial's Board of Management decided to make the building a space for the remembrance of all Australian involvement in war. This involvement would be characterised as a continuation of Australia's experience of World War I.

The building was completed in 1941, after the outbreak of World War II. It was officially opened following a Remembrance Day ceremony on 11 November 1941 by the then Governor-General Lord Gowrie, a former soldier whose honours include the Victoria Cross. Additions since the 1940s have allowed the remembrance of Australia's participation in all recent conflicts. The Tomb of the Unknown Australian Soldier was added in 1993, to mark the 75th anniversary of the end of World War I.

Directors
The following individuals have served as directors of the Australian War Memorial:

Chairman of the Council of the Australian War Memorial
The following individuals have served as chairman of the Australian War Memorial Council:

Remembrance Driveway
Remembrance Nature Park, located behind the war memorial, is the Canberra terminus of the Remembrance Driveway, a system of arboreal parks, landmarks and road-side stops between Sydney and Canberra commemorating the 24 World War II and Vietnam War Victoria Cross recipients. Within that nature park is a small bronze plaque mounted on a large boulder, commemorating Indigenous Australians who have fought for their country.

Anzac Parade
Anzac Parade is a short, broad boulevard named in honour of the soldiers of the Australian and New Zealand Army Corps (ANZAC). It stretches from near the north shore of Lake Burley Griffin to the foot of the memorial proper, along the line of sight from Parliament House. It separates the residential suburbs of Campbell and Reid, and is fairly heavily trafficked as a route between northeast Canberra (Dickson etc.) and Kings Avenue Bridge.

Along each side of the Parade is a row of monuments commemorating specific military campaigns or services, such as the Vietnam War and Australia's wartime nurses. The monuments are mostly sculptures in a variety of styles ranging from naturalistic to Modern.

The foot of the Parade, near the lake, is paired by monumental sculptures in the form of gigantic basket handles, donated to the memorial by New Zealand. The two monuments are dedicated to Australia and New Zealand respectively, and are inspired by the Māori proverb Mau tena kiwai o te kete, maku tenei, "Each of us at a handle of the basket", signifying the long tradition of cooperation and general closeness between the two Commonwealth countries.

The symbolic association of the two nations is carried forward in the vegetation decorating Anzac Parade. Long beds of New Zealand Hebe shrubs line the middle of the avenue, and behind the two rows of monuments are narrow bands of Australian eucalypt trees.

Commemorative area
The memorial proper is sited on a broad pie slice-shaped lawn at the north end of Anzac Parade. The commemorative area is situated in the open centre of the memorial building, (including the cloisters to each side and the Hall of Memory under the building's central dome) and the sculpture garden is on the lawn to the west.

The heart of the commemorative area is the Hall of Memory, a tall domed chapel with a small floor plan in the form of an octagon. The walls are lined with tiny mosaic tiles from the floor to the dome. Inside lies the Tomb of the Unknown Australian Soldier.

Three of the walls, facing east, west and south feature stained glass designs representing qualities of Australian servicemen and women. At the four walls facing northeast, northwest, southeast and southwest are mosaic images of a sailor, a servicewoman, a soldier and an airman respectively.

The mosaic and stained glass are the work of the one-armed Australian muralist Napier Waller, who lost his right arm at Bullecourt during World War I and learned to write and create his works with his left arm. He completed his work in 1958.

In front of the Hall of Memory is a narrow courtyard with a memorial pool surrounding an eternal flame and flanked by footpaths and shrubbery, including plantings of rosemary for remembrance. Above the courtyard to either side are long cloisters containing the Roll of Honour, a series of bronze plaques naming the 103,010 Australian servicemen and women killed in conflict or on peacekeeping operations. The plaques include names dating back to the British Sudanese Expedition, the Second Boer War, and the Boxer Rebellion.

The entire long wall of the west gallery is covered with the names of the 66,000 who died during or as a result of wounds, injuries or illness resulting from service in World War I between 4 August 1914 and 31 March 1921. The thousands of veterans who died as a result of war wounds after 31 March 1921 are not memorialised in the Roll of Honour. The east gallery is covered with the names of those who died during or after World War II between 3 September 1939 and 30 June 1947 and other conflicts or military operations since.

The roll shows the names only, not rank or other awards, as "all men are equal in death". Visiting relatives and friends insert poppies in the gaps between the bronze plaques, beside the names of those they wish to honour. This tradition originated when the Unknown Australian Soldier was interred, as the poppies were originally intended for his grave. Many continue to be inserted beside the names of those who died. The memorial only remove the poppies when the plaques have to be rewaxed for their preservation, otherwise, the memorial staff make no effort to remove them.

The Colonial Gallery previously located behind the Temporary Exhibits Gallery states that the Imperial Bushman Breaker Morant of the Boer War does not appear in the Roll of Honour, not because he was dishonoured, but because he was not a member of the Australian armed forces. Conversely with the inclusion of the commemorative book which lists the names of all the Australians who died in service of other allied armies, he is also absent, this is due to the fact that he was neither serving in an allied regular unit, nor was technically an Australian Citizen at the time.

In September 2022, the Roll of Honour passed the 103,000 milestone point for names of Australian service personnel killed in war and war-like operations.

Last Post ceremony
The memorial started conducting Last Post ceremonies on 17 April 2013 when they featured the story of Private Robert Poate of the 6th Battalion, Royal Australian Regiment, who was killed in Afghanistan in 2012.

When the memorial closes each day, there is a Last Post ceremony at which visitors can gather at the entrance of the Commemorative Area. This ceremony involves the reading of the story of one of the 102,815 people whose names are on the Roll of Honour. The host welcomes visitors to the ceremony, which starts with the national anthem and a brief explanation as to the origins of the memorial and the explanation of the ceremony that is about to take place. Then a piper and a bugler descend from the Hall of Memory. The piper plays "Flowers of the Forest" as visitors, family members of the individual being honoured that day, or visiting dignitaries lay wreaths of floral tributes at the base of the Pool of Reflection beside a portrait (if available) of whoever is the subject of that day's story. If there is no photo on record, the image of a tri-folded Australian flag is displayed in its place. After, a member of the Australian Defence Force (ADF) reads out the story, covering where the honoured person grew up, what they did prior to enlisting in the ADF, what actions (if any) they participated in during their respective conflict, and invariably the circumstances of their death and burial. Following this the ADF member will ascend to the balcony above the Eternal Flame and recite the Ode of Remembrance. The piper will then play the "Last Post". At the completion of this the ADF member, the piper, and bugler will return to the Hall of Memory and the doors will be closed. The host then gives a closing address and the memorial officially closes.

On 14 January 2016, the memorial held its 1,000th Last Post ceremony where it featured the story of Flight Sergeant Lindsay Arthur Bayley, who was killed on active service with No. 9 Squadron, Royal Air Force, during the Second World War.

On Anzac Day and Remembrance Day, the Eulogy to the Unknown (the speech made by then Prime Minister Paul Keating when the Unknown Australian Soldier was interred) is read instead of a specific individual. Along with Christmas Day, when the memorial is closed, these are the only days on which the Last Post ceremony does not take place.

Barring any further additions to the Roll of Honour it will not be until 2295 that all of the names on the Roll of Honour would have had their stories read. During the COVID-19 Pandemic, and the closure of the Australian War Memorial during that time, the Last Post ceremony was temporarily suspended, with rebroadcasts, or stories told via deployed service personnel focusing on those stories already told that had audio or video issues.

Forecourt and Stone of Remembrance
The forecourt is the part of the commemorative area that is the main place in Canberra where Anzac Day and Remembrance Day services are held. These services are normally attended by federal parliament representatives and officials from foreign embassies and Commonwealth high commissions, most notably New Zealand. The Stone of Remembrance is the focal point for these activities, and the steps from the memorial towards Anzac Parade lead to the stone then to the Parade. The grassed sides of the forecourt form a natural amphitheatre that can accommodate around 35,000 to 40,000 people at a typical Anzac Day Dawn Service. Most will be standing, but the memorial erects some staged seating for Anzac Day and Remembrance Day.

Memorial building

The memorial is a two-storey building with a floor plan in the shape of a Byzantine cross. The building is of Byzantine architecture style with strong styling elements of Art Deco throughout. In 2001, a new, broad annexe called ANZAC Hall was added to the north of the original building. In order to preserve the view of the original building from Anzac Parade, Anzac Hall was designed to be recessed in the ground, and hidden behind a wall.

The upper level is dedicated primarily to World War I (the entire west wing) and World War II (the entire east wing). The World War I gallery, is arrayed in chronological order from the start of Australia's involvement in the war. The first two sections of the Gallery relate extensively to the Gallipoli campaign. The World War I gallery was redeveloped in 2014 for the centenary of the First World War, and was reopened in November 2014. Between the wings lies Aircraft Hall, which contains a number of complete aircraft, encompassing air power in the Pacific and contains aircraft mostly from the World War II era including a restored Japanese A6M Zero, that was flown in combat over New Guinea.

At the 'heart' of the building resides the Hall of Valour, a display of 76 of the 101 Victoria Crosses awarded to Australian soldiers; the largest publicly held collection of Victoria Crosses in the world. The gallery is built to resemble a Victoria Cross with the left hand side dedicated to the WW1 VC recipients, and the right to the WW2, Vietnam and Afghanistan. The collection has on display the first and last Imperial VCs (Major General Sr Neville Reginald Howse and Warrant Officer Class 2 Keith Payne) and all four of the VCs awarded under the Australian award system. There is an individual display for the holder of each Cross shown there, with a photograph, an excerpt from the citation that accompanied the award, and usually additional medals awarded to that recipient. The relatives of Australian VC holders often donate or loan the Crosses to the memorial for safekeeping and greater public awareness of their honoured kin. Architecturally the centre of the Hall of Valour is positioned directly under the Tomb of the Unknown Australian Soldier.

On 24 July 2006, Kerry Stokes purchased the 60th VC medal at auction for a world-record price of A$1,000,000 and asked that it be displayed in the Victoria Cross Gallery. This medal was awarded to Captain Alfred Shout for hand-to-hand combat at the Lone Pine trenches in Gallipoli, Turkey. The Victoria Cross Gallery now has all nine VCs awarded to Australians at Gallipoli: Alexander Burton, William Dunstan, John Hamilton, Albert Jacka, Leonard Keysor, Alfred Shout, William Symons, Hugo Throssell and Frederick Tubb.

The lower level contains the Afghanistan: Australia's Story Gallery which currently is the sole audio-visual Gallery in the memorial, a research area, a gallery for Colonial and Pre-Federation Conflicts including the War in Sudan, the Boxer Rebellion and the Boer War, and the Conflicts: Post 1945 to Today, Cold War Gallery comprising exhibits for the Korean War, the conflicts in Malaya and Indonesia and the Vietnam War. This section also encompasses the Peacekeeping Gallery and exhibits dedicated to both Gulf Wars. It also has an area for temporary special exhibitions.

The Large Technology Gallery ANZAC Hall was a large annexe to the upper level of the memorial, used for the display of large military hardware. Notable displays on the west side include a complete and particularly historic Lancaster bomber known as G for George, The wrecks of M-14 and M-21 reconstructed to form a Japanese Ko-hyoteki class midget submarine as both were sunk during the raid on Sydney Harbour in 1942, rare German aircraft such as the Me 262 and Me 163, One of the main guns each from HMAS Sydney and SMS Emden, The east side includes a World War I aircraft exhibition, notably displaying a Royal Aircraft Factory SE5a, Pfalz D.XII and Albatros D.Va, among others These aircraft are accompanied by a movie directed by Peter Jackson titled "Over the Front" highlighting the formation of the Australian Flying Corps. Each of the large permanent exhibits are accompanied by an audio-visual experience. they are from West to East.

 Strike by Night: Accompanying G for George (Played on the hour) - This video has been moved to Aircraft Hall
 Sydney Under Attack: Accompanying the reconstructed Japanese Midget Submarine (Played on Even half hours i.e. 1030, 1230, 230, 430)
 Our First Naval Victory: Accompanying the Guns from HMAS Sydney and SMS Emden (Played on Odd hours opposite Sydney Under Attack)
 Over The Front: a Separate Video played alongside the WW1 Aircraft Collection (Played quarter past the hour)
ANZAC Hall was closed to the public in September 2021, and demolished during the COVID-19 pandemic lock downs of Canberra.

The building is large and the collections are extensive; a full day will suffice for only the most cursory examination of its contents, the conservative estimate is a minimum of three days is required to see every single item on display gallery item to gain any recollection. A gift shop and one coffee shop are on site, on the east side of the main building, named "Poppy's Cafe".

Sculpture garden 

The sculpture garden on the west lawn of the memorial contains a variety of outdoor monuments. The footpath through the garden is embedded with bronze plaques commemorating various branches of service, specific units and historical events. There is also a number of sculptures, including a gigantic figure of a World War II-era Australian soldier that was originally located in the Hall of Memory, before the Tomb of the Unknown Soldier was placed there. There is a gun turret and Bridge from HMAS Brisbane, a gun barrel from the heavy cruiser HMAS Australia and the barrel from the Amiens Gun – a huge railroad gun captured from the Germans during World War I.

At the western side of the memorial between the Administrative Building and the Main Building there is a Centurion Tank and a Thales Bushmaster.

This area is used for special displays during annual Memorial Open Days, and summertime band concerts are held on the nearby lawn.

Storage facility
Only 5 percent of the Memorial's collection is displayed at any time, with the remainder being stored at the Treloar Resource Centre in the industrial suburb of Mitchell. The facility also includes workshops that are used for restoration tasks. The Treloar Technology Centre is occasionally opened to the public for "Big Things in Store" open days.

Publications
The memorial played a key role in sponsoring the official histories that were produced for World War I, World War II, Korea and Vietnam. In addition, the memorial currently produces a quarterly magazine called Wartime. Featuring images from the memorial's collection and articles written by established historians, according to the AWM, the magazine is "...devoted to the Australian experience of war; military history; and the effects of war on society". The magazine's first issue was published in November 1997.

The memorial also previously published a journal titled The Journal of the Australian War Memorial. In October 2003, after publishing 39 issues, the journal went into hiatus, although a fortieth and final issue was published in January 2007.

Music 
The memorial's first musical artist-in-residence was Christopher Latham, who in 2015 began the Flowers of War series to commemorate First World War musicians and artists. His Gallipoli Symphony premiered in 2015 and Diggers' Requiem in 2018. The memorial commissioned Latham's Vietnam Requiem, which was first performed in June 2021, and works are planned to commemorate the Korean War (2023), the Holocaust (2024), and World War II (2025).

See also 

 Auckland War Memorial Museum Tāmaki Paenga Hira
 Canadian National Vimy Memorial
 Canadian Tomb of the Unknown Soldier
 National Memorial Hall For Israel's Fallen
 National War Memorial (Canada)
 Poklonnaya Hill
 Arlington National Cemetery
 List of Australian military memorials
 Stella Bowen

References

Attribution 
Building

Bibliography 
Building

Further reading
  (210 pages)

External links 

 
 Australian War Memorial at Google Cultural Institute

 
Art Deco architecture in the Australian Capital Territory
Buildings and structures completed in 1941
Gallipoli campaign museum exhibits
Military memorials in Canberra
National museums of Australia
Australian National Heritage List
Australian Capital Territory places listed on the defunct Register of the National Estate
Commonwealth Heritage List places in the Australian Capital Territory
World War I memorials in Australia
Tourist attractions in Canberra
1941 establishments in Australia